Empress Dowager Wang (王太后) may refer to:

 Empress Wang Zhi (王娡) (died 126 BC), empress dowager of the Han Dynasty, Emperor Wu's mother
 Empress Wang (Xuan) (died 16 BC), empress dowager of the Han Dynasty, Emperor Yuan's stepmother
 Wang Zhengjun (王政君) (71 BC – AD 13), empress dowager of the Han Dynasty, Emperor Cheng's mother
 Empress Wang (Ping) (8 BC – AD 23), empress dowager of the Han Dynasty
 Wang Yuanji (王元姬) (217–268), empress dowager of the Jin Dynasty
 Wang Xianyuan (王憲嫄) (427–464), empress dowager of the Liu Song Dynasty, Emperor Qianfei's mother
 Wang Zhenfeng (王貞風) (436–479), empress dowager of the Liu Song Dynasty, Emperor Houfei's stepmother
 Wang Baoming (王寶明) (455–512), empress dowager of Southern Qi
Empress Dowager Wang (Xiao Dong) (fl. 551), empress dowager of the Liang Dynasty, Xiao Dong's mother
 Empress Wang (Xiao Cha) (died 563), empress dowager of the Liang Dynasty, Xiao Kui's stepmother
 Empress Dowager Wang (Xianzong) (763–816), empress dowager of the Tang Dynasty, Emperor Xianzong's mother
 Empress Dowager Wang (Jingzong) (died 845), empress dowager of the Tang Dynasty, Emperor Jingzong's mother
 Empress Dowager Wang (Rui) (died 928), empress dowager of the Wu state
 Empress Dowager Wang (Southern Ming) (c. 1594?–1651), empress dowager of the Southern Ming Dynasty

See also
 Empress Wang (disambiguation)

Wang